Rockin' My Life Away is the tenth studio album released by George Thorogood and the Destroyers.  It was released in 1997 on Capitol Records.  The album peaked at #5 on the Billboard Top Blues Album chart.

Track listing
 "Get Back into Rockin'" (Jerry Lynn Williams) – 4:16
 "Trouble Every Day" (Frank Zappa) – 4:16
 "Night Rider" (Thorogood) – 3:43
 "The Usual" (John Hiatt) – 3:51
 "Living With the Shades Pulled Down" (Merle Haggard) – 3:26
 "Manhattan Slide" (Elmore James) – 3:31
 "Rocking My Life Away" (Mack Vickery) – 3:33
 "Jail Bait" (Andre Williams) – 3:41
 "My Dog Can't Bark" (Otis "Big Smokey" Smothers) – 4:00
 "Blues Hangover" (Slim Harpo, West) – 4:18
 "Stoop Down Baby" (Chick Willis) – 3:18
 "Rock & Roll Man" (Thorogood) – 2:50

Personnel
The following personnel are credited on the album:

Musicians
 George Thorogood – guitar, vocals
 Waddy Wachtel – guitar, producer
 Billy Blough – bass
 Jeff Simon – drums
 Hank Carter – guitar, keyboards, saxophone, vocals
 Tony Berg – tambourine, tamboura

Technical
 Delaware Destroyers – producer
 Brian Scheuble – engineer
 Jim Liberato – guitar technician
 Henry Marquez – art direction
 Robert Laverdiere – package design
 Chris Cuffaro – photography

References

George Thorogood and the Destroyers albums
1997 albums
Albums produced by Waddy Wachtel
Capitol Records albums